Strengthen the Arm of Liberty Monument may refer to:

 Strengthen the Arm of Liberty Monument (Pine Bluff, Arkansas)
 Strengthen the Arm of Liberty Monument (Fayetteville, Arkansas)
 Strengthen the Arm of Liberty Monument (Overland Park, Kansas)
 Strengthen the Arm of Liberty Monument (Austin, Texas)

See also
 Strengthen the Arm of Liberty
 Replicas of the Statue of Liberty